General elections were held in Libya to elect the House of Representatives on 10 October 1964. Following the 1952 elections political parties had been banned, so all candidates contested the election as independents. Although its spokesmen were arrested, the opposition managed to obtain representation in parliament. As a result, King Idris dissolved the Assembly and early elections were held the following year.

References

Libya
Elections in Libya
1964 in Libya
Non-partisan elections
Libya